Marcel Louis 'Nugget' Hilsz (9 February 1921 – 15 May 1997) was an Australian rules footballer who played for St Kilda in the VFL and Perth in the WAFL.

Hilsz began at Perth in 1938 but saw his early career interrupted by the Second World War. While on war service in Victoria he spent some time with St Kilda and played eight VFL games in 1942. He played most of his football as a hard running defender but could also play forward, topping Perth's goal kicking list with 65 goals in 1951. His best football was played after the war and he represented Western Australia in eight interstate games.

He is a member of Perth's official 'Team of the Century' in the back pocket.

References

External links

Ozburials

1921 births
Australian rules footballers from Western Australia
St Kilda Football Club players
Perth Football Club players
1997 deaths
Australian Army personnel of World War II
Australian Army soldiers